Bolivia comparatively has experienced far less immigration than its South American neighbors. Nevertheless, small groups of Germans, Spaniards, Italians, a small Yugoslavian community, and others live in the country. The Basques were a large source of Spanish and European immigration from the late 16th to early 20th centuries, most came as shepherds and ranchers to Bolivia's vast livestock industry.

Similar to other Latin American nations, Bolivia has experienced a small Japanese migration. Beginning in 1899 a small migration of Japanese began that continued until the 1970s. Small Japanese communities were formed in the Bolivian department of Santa Cruz. Other East Asians (Taiwanese and Chinese) and West Asians such as the (Lebanese and Syrians) developed their own communities in Bolivia in the late 20th century. During the 20th century Bolivia received a small number of Jews, mainly Ashkenazi.

Country of birth of Bolivian residents 
According to the 2001 Census 87,338 of the Bolivian resident population were born outside Bolivia, representing 1.06% of the total Bolivian resident population.

References 

La Inmigración japonesa en Bolivia: Estudios historicos y socio-economicos ed. Yasuo Wakatsuki and Iyo Kunimoto

 
Demographics of Bolivia
Society of Bolivia